Fyodorov or Fedorov (masculine) and Fyodorova or Fedorova (Фёдорова, feminine) is a common Russian last name that is derived from the given name Fyodor and literally means Fyodor's. It is transliterated in Polish as Fiodorow (masculine) and Fiodorowa (feminine), in Belarusian as Fiodaraŭ, and in Estonian Fjodorov.

Notable people with the name include:
 Aleksandr Fyodorov (disambiguation), multiple people
 Aleksey Fyodorov (disambiguation), multiple people
 Alfred Fyodorov (1935–2001), Soviet football player and coach
Alicja Fiodorow (born 1985), Polish Paralympic athlete
 Andrei Fyodorov (disambiguation), multiple people
 Anna Fedorova (born 1990), Ukrainian pianist
 Anthony Fedorov (born 1985), American Idol Season Four finalist
 Boris Fyodorov (1958–2008), Russian economist and politician
 Evgraf Fedorov (1853–1919), Russian mathematician, crystallographer and mineralogist
 Evgraf Fedorov Jr. (1880–1965), Russian climatologist
 Fedor Fedorov (ice hockey) (born 1981), Russian ice hockey player
 Fiodar Fiodaraŭ (1911–1994), Belarusian physicist
 Igor Fedorov (born 2000), Russian boxer
 Irina Feodorova, Soviet historian and ethnographer
 Ivan Fyodorov (disambiguation), multiple people
Joanna Fiodorow (born 1989), Polish hammer thrower
 Leonid Feodorov (1879–1935), Russian ecclesiastical figure
 Marina Fedorova (born 1997), Russian football forward
 Miron Fyodorov (born 1985), Russian rapper
 Nikolai Fyodorovich Fyodorov (1829–1903), Russian cosmist and philosopher
 Nikolay Fyodorov (disambiguation), multiple people
 Oleksiy Fedorov (1901–1989), leader of the Soviet Ukrainian partisan movement
 Oxana Fedorova (born 1977), Russian Miss Universe 2002
 Sergei Fyodorov (disambiguation), multiple people
 Svyatoslav Fyodorov (1927–2000), Russian ophthalmologist and eye microsurgeon
 Victor Fyodorov (1885–1922), Russian World War I flying ace
 Viktoriya Fyodorova (born 1973), Russian high jumper
 Vladimir Fyodorov (disambiguation), multiple people
 Yevgeny Fyodorov (disambiguation), multiple people
 Yuri Fedorov (born 1949), Soviet ice hockey player
 Zoya Fyodorova (1907–1981), Russian actress

See also
Fyodor, first name
 Fedorov (crater), a lunar crater
 Akademik Fedorov, research ship, named after geophysicist Yevgeny Fyodorov
 Fedoriv
 Todorov, Bulgarian cognate

Russian-language surnames
Patronymic surnames
Surnames from given names